The National Democratic Front (FND) is a political party in the Central African Republic.

History
Established in 1997, the party joined the National Convergence "Kwa Na Kwa" alliance for the 2005 general elections. The alliance won 42 seats, of which the FND won one.

In 2010 the FND joined the Presidential Majority alliance in preparation for the 2011 general elections. The party nominated three candidates for the 105 seats in the National Assembly, and although the alliance won 11 seats, the FND failed to win a seat.

References

1997 establishments in the Central African Republic
Political parties established in 1997
Political parties in the Central African Republic